Lieutenant-General Sir Richard Maurice Hilton Vickers  (born 21 August 1928) is a former British Army officer who served as Director-General of Army Training from 1982 until 1983.

Military career
Educated at Haileybury and Imperial Service College and Royal Military Academy Sandhurst, Vickers was commissioned into the Royal Tank Regiment (RTR) in 1948, and served with the 1st Battalion of the RTR in the British Army of the Rhine (BAOR), Korea, and the Middle East until 1954. He was temporary Equerry to the Queen from 1956 until 1959 and brigade major of 7th Armoured Brigade from 1962 until 1964. He served with the 4th Battalion of the RTR in Borneo and Malaysia from 1964 until 1966 and was Commanding Officer of The Royal Dragoons from 1967 until 1968 when he became commanding officer of the Blues and Royals. Vickers was the Commander of the 11th Armoured Brigade from 1972 until 1974 and Deputy Director of Army Training 1975 until 1977. He was appointed GOC 4th Armoured Division in 1977 and then Commandant of the Royal Military Academy Sandhurst from 1979 until 1982 before he retired in 1983.

In retirement Vickers was a Gentleman Usher to the Queen from 1986 until 1998 and Director-General of the Winston Churchill Memorial Trust 1983–1993. 

Vickers was made a Lieutenant of the Royal Victorian Order (LVO) in 1959 and a Commander of the Order (CVO) in 1998. He was appointed a Member of the Order of the British Empire (MBE) in 1964, promoted to an Officer of the Order (OBE) in 1970, and to a Knight Commander of the Order (KCB) in 1983.

References 

|-

1928 births
Living people
British Army lieutenant generals
Free Foresters cricketers
Royal Tank Regiment officers
1st The Royal Dragoons officers
Equerries
People educated at Haileybury and Imperial Service College
Commandants of Sandhurst
Knights Commander of the Order of the Bath
Commanders of the Royal Victorian Order
Officers of the Order of the British Empire
Gentlemen Ushers
British Army personnel of the Korean War